Premuda is a Croatian island.

Premuda may also refer to:

Ships
 Italian torpedo boat Premuda - Italian interwar torpedo boat
 Italian destroyer Premuda - Italian WW2 destroyer
 Premuda (passenger ferry)